College Fjord is a fjord located in the northern sector of Prince William Sound in the U.S. state of Alaska. The fjord contains five tidewater glaciers (glaciers that terminate in water), five large valley glaciers, and dozens of smaller glaciers, most named after renowned East Coast colleges (women's colleges for the NW side, and men's colleges for the SE side).  College Fjord was discovered in 1899 during the Harriman Expedition, at which time the glaciers were named. The expedition included a Harvard and an Amherst professor, and they named many of the glaciers after elite colleges. According to Bruce Molina, author of Alaska's Glaciers, "They took great delight in ignoring Princeton."

Incomplete list of College Fjord glaciers
Amherst Glacier
Baby Glacier
Barnard Glacier
Bryn Mawr Glacier
Crescent Glacier
Downer Glacier
Harvard Glacier
Holyoke Glacier
Smith Glacier
Vassar Glacier
Wellesley Glacier
Williams Glacier
Yale Glacier

Glaciers near College Fjord
These glaciers were also named by members of the Harriman Alaska Expedition (see map at https://www.pbs.org/harriman/images/log/lectures/crossengl/barrymap_lg.jpg), but they don't border College Fjord:
Columbia Glacier (Alaska)
Dartmouth Glacier
Barry Glacier
Surprise Glacier
Harriman Glacier
Serpentine Glacier
Cataract Glacier

Bodies of water of Chugach Census Area, Alaska
Fjords of Alaska
Tourist attractions in Chugach Census Area, Alaska